MV Skookum is the name of two ferries, both of which operated on Okanagan Lake in British Columbia, Canada:

  
 

Ship names